Randi Lives in Norway (also: Gerda Lives in Norway, original title: Randi bor i Norge) is the title of a book by the Swedish writer Astrid Lindgren, with photos by Anna Riwkin-Brick. In 1965 the book was published by Rabén & Sjögren.

Plot 
Randi lives in Lofoten. Her father is a fisherman. At home, Randi plays a lot with her neighbor and friend Helga. One day, however, Randi prefers to play with Reidar. When Helga runs after her and asks if she can play with Randi, Randi throws a snowball right into Helga's face. Then she runs away with Reidar. Helga does not give up and follows the friends. However the children continue throwing snowballs at Helga. Helga runs home crying. In the evening Randi feels bad because she was so mean to Helga and Helga was so sad. When she wants to play with Helga the next morning, Randi is afraid that Helga does not want to see her again. But Helga wants to play with Randi and tells Randi that she really likes her, even though Randi had been mean to her the day before.

Overview 
Randi Lives in Norway is the tenth of 15 books of the series Children's Everywhere. The book was first published in 1965 by the Swedish publisher Rabén & Sjögren. In addition, the book has been translated into many different languages, including English and German. In the American version, Randi retains her name in the British version, her name is Gerda. The story takes place in a northern Norwegian village in Lofoten.

Reception

Reviews 
The jury of the Youth Literature Prize justifies the nomination of the book for the German Youth Literature Prize by stating that the children and the fishing village are turned into pictures that are so lively, that the children can literally smell the fish and feel the cold. This gives a good impression of the landscape and the people in Lofoten.

Nominations 
Deutscher Jugendliteraturpreis
 1966: Randi Lives in Norway (Randi bor i Norge): picture book

Editions 
 Randi bor i Norge, Rabén & Sjögren, 1965, Swedish Edition
 Gerda Lives in Norway, Methuen Publishing, 1965, British Edition
 Randi Lives in Norway, The Macmillan Company, 1965, US-american Edition
 Randi aus Norwegen, Oetinger Verlag, 1965, German Edition
 Ingrid as an Iorua, Oifig an tSoláthair, 1979, Irish Edition
 Randi bor i Norge, Høst & søn, 1966, Danish Edition
 Randi bor i Lofoten, Gyldendal, 1965, Norwegian Edition

References 

Works by Astrid Lindgren
1968 children's books
Methuen Publishing books
Rabén & Sjögren books
Novels set in Norway